Kiełpin   (1942–1945 Kelpen) is  a village in the administrative district of Gmina Tuchola, within Tuchola County, Kuyavian-Pomeranian Voivodeship, in north-central Poland.

The village has a population of 820.

References

Villages in Tuchola County